The Distaff Gospels (Les Evangiles des Quenouilles) is an Old French fifteenth-century collection of popular beliefs held by late medieval women, first published in 1480. It was edited by Fouquart de Cambray, Duval Antoine and Jean d'Arras and published at Bruges by Colart Mansion. The narrative takes place within the context of a gathering of women who meet with their spindles and distaffs to spin. They discuss folk wisdom related to their domestic lives, including controlling errant husbands, predicting the gender of future offspring and curing common ailments.

Editions
Les évangiles des quenouilles. Paris: P. Jannet, 1855
Les Evangiles des quenouilles; édition critique, introduction et notes par Madeleine Jeay. Paris; Montréal: Librairie philosophique J. Vrin; Presses de l'Université de Montréal, 1985
Les Evangiles des quenouilles; traduits et présentés par Jacques Lacarrière. Paris: A. Michel, 1998

English translations
The gospelles of dystaues. London: Wynkyn de Worde, [c. 1510] (translated by Henry Watson)
Jeay, Madeleine and Kathleen Garay, eds. and trans. 2006.The Distaff Gospels. Peterborough, ON: Broadview Press.

Further reading
Paupert, Anne Les fileuses et le clerc: une étude des Evangiles des quenouilles. Paris; Genève: Champion; Slatkine, 1990

Medieval French literature
Spinning
1480 books
Textiles in folklore
Magic (supernatural)
Occult texts